Hannah Viller Møller (born 4 August 2001) is a Danish tennis player.

On the ITF Junior Circuit, Viller Møller reached a career-high combined ranking of 103, achieved on 2 April 2018. 

Viller Møller made her Fed Cup debut for Denmark in 2019.

Junior career
Junior Grand Slam results - Singles:

 Australian Open: 1R (2018)
 French Open: Q2 (2018)
 Wimbledon: Q1 (2018)
 US Open: Q2 (201)8

Junior Grand Slam results - Doubles:

 Australian Open: –
 French Open: –
 Wimbledon: –
 US Open: –

ITF finals

Singles: 1 (1 runner–up)

Doubles: 1 (1 title)

References

External links
 
 

2001 births
Living people
Danish female tennis players